Rowesville is a town in Orangeburg County, South Carolina, United States. The population was 304 at the 2010 census.

History
Cattle Creek Campground was listed on the National Register of Historic Places in 1983.

Geography
Rowesville is located at  (33.373430, -80.836251).

According to the United States Census Bureau, the town has a total area of 0.8 square mile (2.0 km2), all land.

Demographics

As of the census of 2000, there were 378 people, 140 households, and 102 families residing in the town. The population density was 476.2 people per square mile (184.7/km2). There were 159 housing units at an average density of 200.3 per square mile (77.7/km2). The racial makeup of the town was 60.85% African American, 38.89% White, and 0.26% from two or more races. Hispanic or Latino of any race were 0.79% of the population.

There were 140 households, out of which 30.0% had children under the age of 18 living with them, 42.1% were married couples living together, 22.9% had a female householder with no husband present, and 27.1% were non-families. 22.1% of all households were made up of individuals, and 12.9% had someone living alone who was 65 years of age or older. The average household size was 2.68 and the average family size was 3.11.

In the town, the population was spread out, with 25.9% under the age of 18, 8.5% from 18 to 24, 29.4% from 25 to 44, 22.5% from 45 to 64, and 13.8% who were 65 years of age or older. The median age was 34 years. For every 100 females, there were 102.1 males. For every 100 females age 18 and over, there were 100.0 males.

The median income for a household in the town was $30,833, and the median income for a family was $36,250. Males had a median income of $24,500 versus $16,591 for females. The per capita income for the town was $13,978. About 12.5% of families and 20.6% of the population were below the poverty line, including 39.7% of those under age 18 and 23.4% of those age 65 or over.

References

External links
Information about Rowesville from Orangeburg County

Towns in Orangeburg County, South Carolina
Towns in South Carolina